Nopera Te Rangiuia (fl. 1835–1850) was a New Zealand Māori tohunga from Ngāti Porou.

References

Year of birth unknown
Year of death unknown
Ngāti Porou people
Tohunga